A Preface to Paradise Lost is one of C. S. Lewis's most famous scholarly works. The book had its genesis in Lewis's Ballard Matthews Lectures which he delivered at the University College of North Wales in 1941.

See also
 Paradise Lost, a 1667 epic poem by John Milton

References

External links
 

1942 non-fiction books
Books by C. S. Lewis
Books of literary criticism